The women's 1500 metres event  at the 1979 European Athletics Indoor Championships was held on 25 February in Vienna.

Results

References

1500 metres at the European Athletics Indoor Championships
1500
Euro